Anjou is a borough (arrondissement) of the city of Montreal.  Prior to its 2002 merger it was an independent city. Although it is no longer an independent city, it is still commonly known as known as Ville d'Anjou.

Geography
The borough is located in the eastern end of the island of Montreal. The borough largely retained its former municipality logo, although the borough's logo is used on fleet vehicles without Montreal's logo.  On fleet vehicles, the text reads "Ville de Montréal, arrondissement Anjou."

The borough is bordered to the north and east by Rivière-des-Prairies–Pointe-aux-Trembles, to the south by Mercier—Hochelaga-Maisonneuve and Montréal-Est, to the west by Saint Leonard, and at the northwestern corner by Montréal-Nord.

It has an area of 13.7 km² and a population of nearly 42,796.

Features

The borough is traversed by Autoroute 40 (Metropolitan Aut.) exits 80 and 82 located within its borders. Exits 6,7,8, (9 and 10 Northbound only) of Autoroute 25 (Louis-Hippolyte La Fontaine Aut.) are also located in Anjou. Among other attractions, it contains the large Les Galeries d'Anjou shopping mall which is one of the few mega malls located within the city of Montreal. The Blue line extension of the Montreal Metro which is expected to be completed in 2029 will have one new station located in Anjou with two entrances located on both sides of Autoroute 25.

Federal and provincial elections
The entire borough is located within the federal riding of Honoré-Mercier, and within the provincial electoral district of Anjou–Louis-Riel.

Borough council
Following the 2021 Montreal municipal election, the current borough council consists of the following councilors:

Demographics

Education

The Centre de Service Scolaire de la Pointe-de-l'Île operates French-language public schools. The secondary school is the École secondaire d'Anjou.

Primary schools
Albatros
Cardinal-Léger
Chénier
Des Roseraies
Jacques-Rousseau
St-Joseph
Wilfrid-Pelletier

The English Montreal School Board operates Anglophone public schools:
 Dalkeith Elementary School

The borough has two libraries of the Montreal Public Libraries Network: Haut-Anjou and Jean-Corbeil.

See also
 Municipal reorganization in Quebec

References

 
Populated places established in 1956
Populated places disestablished in 2002
Former municipalities in Quebec
Former cities in Quebec
Boroughs of Montreal
1956 establishments in Quebec
2002 disestablishments in Quebec